Gasco may refer to:
 GASCO, an Australian leading thermal, combustion and process engineering company
 GASCO, an Abu Dhabi gas company
 National Gas & Industrialization Company (GASCO), a Saudi gas company
 Egyptian Natural Gas Company (GASCO)
 Gassco, a Norwegian gas pipeline operator
 FC Gasco, a Somali football club
 Gasco FC, an Egyptian football club
 Gasco (basketball), an Egyptian basketball club
 General Aviation Safety Council (GASCo), a UK general aviation organization